Bilateral relations between Brazil and Costa Rica commenced in 1907, when the first Brazilian diplomats were officially accredited by the Costa Rican government.  Costa Rica has an embassy in Brasilia, and Brazil has an embassy in San José. Also, Costa Rica has consulates in Curitiba, Florianópolis, Rio de Janeiro and São Paulo. Both countries are members of Organization of American States.

State visits
Since the establishment of diplomatic links, four Costa Rican Presidents have visited Brazil (José Figueres (1974), José María Figueres (1997), Miguel Ángel Rodríguez (1999) and Óscar Arias (2008)), and two Brazilian Presidents have visited Costa Rica (Fernando Henrique Cardoso (2000) and Luiz Inácio Lula da Silva (2009).

See also 
 Foreign relations of Brazil
 Foreign relations of Costa Rica

References

External links
 Embassy of Costa Rica in Brasilia
 Embassy of Brazil in San José

 
Costa Rica
Bilateral relations of Costa Rica